Inor can refer to:

 Inor language, spoken in Ethiopia
 Inor, Meuse, France